Bangriposi is a Vidhan Sabha constituency of Mayurbhanj district, Odisha. Area of this constituency includes Bangriposi block, Shamakhunta block and Kuliana block.

In the 2019 election, Biju Janata Dal candidate Sudam Marndi, defeated Bharatiya Janata Party candidate Sugda Murmu by a margin of 11,844 votes.

Elected Members

14 elections held during 1961 to 2019. List of members elected from Bangriposi Vidhan Sabha constituency are:

2019 (29):Sudam Marndi (BJD)
2014 (29):Sudam Marndi (BJD)
2009 (29): Sarojini Hembram (BJD)
2004 (5): Chaitanya Prasad Majhi (BJD)
2000 (5): Purusottam Naik (Independent)
1995 (5): Ajen Murmu (JMM)
1990 (5): Sudam Charan Marandi (Independent)
1985 (5): Kangoi Singh (Congress) 
1980 (5): Kangoi Singh (Congress-I)
1977 (5): Purusottam Naik (Janata Party)
1974 (5): Rudra Mohan Das (CPI)
1971 (5): Radha Mohan Naik (PSP)
1967 (5): Radha Mohan Naik (PSP)
1961 (138): Ishwara Chandra Naik (Congress)

Election results

2019 Election

2014 Election

2009 Election

Notes

References

Politics of Mayurbhanj district
Assembly constituencies of Odisha